After School Satan is an after school program project of The Satanic Temple, an American religious organization based in Salem, Massachusetts, and is sponsored by Reason Alliance LTD, a 501(c)(3) non-profit organization. It was created as an alternative to Christian-based after school groups, specifically at schools that host the Evangelical  Good News Club. The program neither teaches about Satanism nor attempts to convert club-goers; they instead teach about rationalism and understanding the world around us. It is against the beliefs of the Satanic Temple to teach religious practice in schools, which is opposite to how the Good News Club functions. The Satanic Temple rejects supernatural beliefs and views Satan as a literary symbol of rebellion against authority, not as a supernatural entity.

The Satanic Temple announced it was pursuing After School Satan clubs in cities across the United States, including Atlanta, Los Angeles, Salt Lake City, Pensacola, Washington, D.C., Tucson, Springfield, Missouri, Seattle and Portland. 

Despite widespread media attention to the announcements initially, only one school in Tacoma, Washington, ever served any students, teaching a single child from a nearby school once per month from December 2016 to June 2017. The program did not return the following year, and by the fall of 2017, TST representative Chalice Blythe confirmed in an interview there were no active programs.

In January 2022, a second After School Satan program launched in Moline, Ill.  Monthly meetings are scheduled through May 2023, with a focus on board and card games, crafts, and science projects.

History
The Supreme Court decision Good News Club v. Milford Central School held that when a government operates a "limited public forum" it may not discriminate against speech that takes place within that forum on the basis of the viewpoint it expresses. The "limited public forum" in the case was referring to after school programs, that the schools provided space for, but were not run by the school.

After School Satan was created by The Satanic Temple in July 2016 to ensure that equal representation for all religions is upheld in public schools, and religious freedom and plurality is respected.  Since the U.S. Supreme Court ruled in 2001 that religious groups are permitted to establish clubs to proselytize after hours using public school classrooms, the Christian-based Good News Club has established thousands of such clubs. In response, The Satanic Temple began a campaign to establish its own clubs across the United States. According to one organizer, "Whenever religion enters the public sphere, like the Good News Club at public schools, we take action to ensure that more than one religious voice is represented, and that is our intent with the After School Satan Club."

Chalice Blythe, former National Director for The Satanic Temple’s After School Satan Club explained, "...The After School Satan Club curriculum was only offered in school districts where local chapters of The Satanic Temple could manage and maintain them."

The clubs follow a standard syllabus, and strive to provide students with the critical thinking skills necessary to be able to make important life decisions for themselves.  They emphasize a scientific and rationalist, non-superstitious world view, and oppose indoctrination into other-worldly belief systems.

According to The Satanic Temple and After School Satan's co-founder and spokesperson, Lucien Greaves:   and adds 

One club in Seattle had to pause their activities during the 2017–2018 school year due to lack of funds and volunteers.

Activities
After School Satan Clubs "incorporate games, projects, and thinking exercises that help children understand how we know what we know about our world and our universe." Satanic Temple spokesman Finn Rezz said the club "would focus on science and rational thinking," promoting "benevolence and empathy for everybody" – while providing an alternative voice to the Bible-centred "Good News Club". After School Satan Clubs do not teach children to believe in supernatural beings named Satan or perform Satanic rituals.

Reception
A group of Christian pastors and other religious leaders met in Tacoma, Washington, to discuss the proposition that the After School Satan program would be allowed at a local school. One pastor remarked, "We want to cut this off and defeat it before it ever gets a chance to take root." Another pastor commented, "We are the taxpayers here and we ought to stand up and let them know they are not welcome, they don't pay taxes here."

See also
 Freedom From Religion Foundation
 Separation of Church and State
 Proselytizing

References

External links
 

Skeptic organizations in the United States
Educational charities based in the United States
Scientific skepticism
Satanism in the United States
The Satanic Temple
2016 establishments in Massachusetts
Religious political organizations